The Saint Vincent and the Grenadines women's national football team is the national women's football team of Saint Vincent and the Grenadines and is overseen by the Saint Vincent and the Grenadines Football Federation.

Results and fixtures

The following is a list of match results in the last 12 months, as well as any future matches that have been scheduled.

Legend

2022

Players

Current squad
The following players were called up for the match against Honduras on 12 April 2022.

Recent call ups

World Cup record

*Draws include knockout matches decided on penalty kicks.

CONCACAF W Championship record

*Draws include knockout matches decided on penalty kicks.

References

External links
Official website
FIFA Profile

 
Caribbean women's national association football teams